Adesh Pratap Singh Kairon (born 1959) is a politician from Punjab, India. He is a four-time Member of Legislative Assembly in the Punjab Legislative Assembly from the Patti Constituency. He has served thrice as a minister. He has held the portfolios of Excise and Taxation, Food and IT.

Kairon belongs to the Kairon political family and was the longest served minister in the state of Punjab. He is the great-grandson of Nihal Singh Kairon, grandson of Pratap Singh Kairon, son of Surinder Singh Kairon, son-in-law of Parkash Singh Badal and brother-in-law of Sukhbir Singh Badal. He is also a nephew (by marriage) of Harcharan Singh Brar. 

Kairon holds a BE degree from Punjab Engineering College and an MBA from Northwestern University's Kellogg School of Management. He has two sons.

References

1959 births
Living people
Shiromani Akali Dal politicians
State cabinet ministers of Punjab, India